Nasrabad (also Romanized as Naşrābād) is a village in Mahvelat-e Shomali Rural District, Shadmehr District, Mahvelat County, Razavi Khorasan Province, Iran. At the 2006 census, its population was 120, in 31 families.

References 

Populated places in Mahvelat County